is a Japanese racing driver. He currently drives in the Super GT GT500 series. He won the Japanese Formula Three - National Class championship in 2012.

Career
Sasaki has raced in Japanese Formula 3 Championship for 2 seasons in National class and one of the season in 2012 he won the title. He is a Nissan Driver Development Program (NDDP) Since 2011. He competed in Super GT in the GT300 Class in 2012 for 2 rounds, and competed full time in 2013 with NDDP Racing. Then promoted to the GT500 Class. He also competed back to Japanese Formula 3 for 2 seasons, in 2014 he competed full time with B-Max Racing Team with NDDP with Mitsunori Takaboshi. He continued compete in Japanese Formula 3 in 2015 & 2016, but only a few cameos. He also attended his first Macau Grand Prix. And most of his career competes in Super GT 500 racing with Kondo Racing from 2014 to 2017 and Team Impul from 2018 towards 2020. He returns to his old team, Kondo Racing in 2021 alongside his old teammate Mitsunori Takaboshi and in 2022 with Kohei Hirate.

Racing record

Career summary

External links
Official website
driverdb

1991 births
Living people
Japanese racing drivers
Japanese Formula 3 Championship drivers
Super GT drivers

Karting World Championship drivers
Nismo drivers
Kondō Racing drivers
B-Max Racing drivers